The Diocese of Bruges (in Dutch Bisdom Brugge) is a Latin Church ecclesiastical territory or diocese of the Catholic Church in Belgium. It is a suffragan in the ecclesiastical province of the metropolitan Archdiocese of Mechelen-Brussels, which covers all of Belgium.

A diocese from 1558 to its suppression in 1801, in 1832 it became a pre-diocesan apostolic vicariate as the Apostolic Administration of West Flanders. Its territory coincides with West Flanders.

The episcopal see of the diocese is Sint-Salvator Cathedral, dedicated to Our Savior, in Bruges, West Flanders, which is also a minor basilica. The patron saint of the diocese is Saint Donatian, so the cathedral is also known as Sint-Salvators- en Donaaskathedraal.

Statistics 
, it pastorally served 965,000 Catholics (82.1% of 1,174,752 total) on 3,145 km² in 362 parishes and 65 missions with 708 priests (499 diocesan, 209 religious), 91 deacons, 1,986 lay religious (290 brothers, 1,696 sisters) and 7 seminarians.

History 
An earlier diocese of Bruges was established on 12 May 1558, on territory split off from the Diocese of Tournai, as part of the great Habsburg reform of the church in the then Spanish Low Countries. Its see, St. Donatian's Cathedral, was destroyed in a fire in 1799 during the aftermath of the French Revolution.

During the reforms under the Napoleonic Concordate, the diocese was suppressed on 15 July 1801 and its territory merged into the Diocese of Ghent.

On 17 December 1832, shortly after the independence of Belgium, the territory was restored as the pre-diocesan Apostolic Administration of West Flanders. On 27 May 1834, the territory was again promoted to diocese and renamed after its see, Bruges, while the incumbent Apostolic Administrator became Suffragan Bishop. On 31 May 1967 the diocese lost a portion of territory to the much older Diocese of Tournai, shortly after a reshuffle of provincial borders involving a few municipalities, notably Mouscron being transferred to the province of Hainaut (to which the bishopric of Tournai is now limited).

In 1985 the diocese of Bruges experienced a papal visit from Pope John Paul II, who on 17 May gave a homily on the horrors of war at Ypres as part of his pastoral visit to the Low Countries.

A 2010 scandal saw Bishop Roger Vangheluwe, a confessed and hardly remorseful pederast, forced into early retirement.

Ordinaries 

Suffragan Bishops (first diocese)
 1560–1567: Petrus Curtius (Petrus De Corte)
 1569–1594: Remigius Driutius (Remi Drieux)
 1596–1602: Mathias Lambrecht
 1604–1616: Charles Philippe de Rodoan
 1616–1620: Anthonius Triest (also bishop of Ghent)
 1623–1629: Denis Stoffels
 1630–1639: Servaas de Quinckere
 1642–1649: Nicolaas de Haudion
 1651–1660: Carolus van den Bosch (afterwards bishop of Ghent)
 1662–1668: Robert de Haynin
 1668–1671: Vacant (diocesan administrator Charles Geleyns)
 1671–1681: François de Baillencourt
 1682–1689: Humbertus Guilielmus de Precipiano (also Archbishop of Mechelen)
 1691–1706: Guilielmus (Willem) Bassery
 1706–1716: Vacant 1716–1742: Hendrik Jozef van Susteren
 1743–1753: Jan-Baptist de Castillon
 1754–1775: Joannes-Robertus Caimo
 1777–1794: Felix Brenart
 SuppressedApostolic Administrator of West Flanders Franciscus Renatus Boussen (January 21, 1833 – May 27, 1834 see next), Titular Bishop of Ptolemais (December 17, 1832 – June 23, 1834), Coadjutor Bishop of Ghent (Belgium) (17 December 1832 – 23 June 1834)Suffragan Bishops (present diocese)
 1834–1848: Franciscus Renatus Boussen (see previous)
 1848–1864: Joannes-Baptista Malou
 1864–1894: Johan Joseph Faict
 1894–1895: Petrus De Brabandere
 1895–1931: Gustavus Waffelaert
 1931–1952: Henricus Lamiroy
 1952–1984: Emiel-Jozef De Smedt
 1984–2010: Roger Joseph Vangheluwe
 2010–2015: Jozef De Kesel, later promoted Metropolitan Archbishop of Mechelen-Brussels
 2016–present: Lode Aerts

See also
 List of Catholic churches in Belgium

Notes

External links and sources 

 GCatholic

Bruges
Bruges
Bruges
Bruges
1834 establishments in Belgium